Langenuen is a strait in Vestland county, Norway. The  strait runs between the islands of Stord and Huftarøy on the west, and Tysnesøy and Reksteren on the east.

References

Landforms of Vestland
Straits of Norway
Tysnes
Fitjar
Stord
Austevoll